Bi Kun (born 12 November 1995) is a Chinese professional windsurfer. He represented China at the 2020 Summer Olympics in Tokyo competing in Men's RS:X where he won a bronze medal.

References

External links 
 
 
 

1995 births
Living people
Chinese windsurfers
Chinese male sailors (sport)
Olympic sailors of China
Olympic bronze medalists for China
Olympic medalists in sailing
Sailors at the 2020 Summer Olympics – RS:X
Medalists at the 2020 Summer Olympics
Asian Games gold medalists for China
Asian Games medalists in sailing
Sailors at the 2018 Asian Games
Medalists at the 2018 Asian Games
21st-century Chinese people